The 2022 FIA Motorsport Games Formula 4 Cup was the second FIA Motorsport Games Formula 4 Cup, to be held at Circuit Paul Ricard, France on 26 October to 30 October 2022. The race was contested with identical Formula 4 cars. The event was the part of the 2022 FIA Motorsport Games.

The event featured two 45-minute practice sessions on 28 October, with 20-minute Qualifying session on 29 October for the Qualifying race, while the Main race was held on 30 October.

Entry list
All drivers utilized KCMG KC MG-01 cars, which were operated by Hitech GP. It was the first Formula 4 car to feature Halo safety device. Also, drivers will not only be chasing medals. KCMG will provide a €10,000 prize fund for the race winner.

Results

Qualifying

Qualifying Race

Race

 Notes 
  Pedro Clerot got a 5 seconds time penalty added to the total race time for having exceeded track limits on 6 separate occasions during the Main Race.
  Charlie Wurz got a 10 seconds time penalty added to the total race time for having went off track at Turn 3 without following the Race Director Event Notes item 11 regarding the safe method to rejoin the track.

References

External links

Formula 4 Cup
2022 in Formula 4